Cruella: Original Motion Picture Soundtrack is the soundtrack album to the film of the same name. It was released on May 21, 2021, by Walt Disney Records. A separate film score album, titled Cruella: Original Score and composed by Nicholas Britell, was released on the same day, under the same label.

Background
On March 31, 2021, it was announced that Nicholas Britell was hired to compose the score for Cruella. "Call Me Cruella", an original song performed by Florence and the Machine, is featured in the film's end credits. The score album and a separate soundtrack album for the film were released on May 21, 2021 by Walt Disney Records.

Albums

Cruella: Original Motion Picture Soundtrack 

The following songs appear in the film but are excluded from the soundtrack:

 "Inside-Looking Out" by the Animals
 "She's a Rainbow", by the Rolling Stones
 "Watch the Dog That Bring the Bone", by Sandy Gaye
 "Time of the Season" by the Zombies
 "I Gotcha" by Joe Tex
 "These Boots Are Made for Walkin'" by Nancy Sinatra
 "The Wild One" by Suzi Quatro
 "Hush" by Deep Purple
 "Car Wash" by Rose Royce
 "Boys Keep Swinging" by David Bowie
 "I Get Ideas" by Tony Martin
 "Theme from A Summer Place" by Norrie Paramor and his Orchestra
 "Perhaps, Perhaps, Perhaps", by Doris Day
 "You're Such a Good Looking Woman" by Joe Dolan
 "Smile" by Judy Garland
 "Nightmares" by the J. Geils Band
 "Gettin' Out" by the J. Geils Band
 "Eternelle" by Brigitte Fontaine
 "The Wizard" by Black Sabbath
 "Sympathy for the Devil" by the Rolling Stones

Cruella: Original Score

References

2021 soundtrack albums
2020s film soundtrack albums
101 Dalmatians
Disney film soundtracks
Comedy-drama film soundtracks
Walt Disney Records soundtracks
Film scores